The women's 200 metre butterfly event at the 2012 Summer Olympics took place on 31 July and 1 August at the London Aquatics Centre in London, United Kingdom.

China's Jiao Liuyang stormed home on the final stretch to upgrade her silver from Beijing four years earlier with an Olympic title in the event. She produced a striking effort on the last lap to come from behind and demolish the field with a gold-medal time and a new Olympic record in 2:04.06, shaving 0.12 seconds off the standard set by teammate Liu Zige. Meanwhile, Mireia Belmonte García made an Olympic milestone to become Spain's first ever female medalist and fourth overall in swimming, as she brought home the silver in 2:05.25, the ninth-fastest of all time. Japan's Natsumi Hoshi added a sixth bronze to her swimming squad at these Games, in a sterling time of 2:05.48.

Leading through the prelims and the semifinals, U.S. swimmer Kathleen Hersey finished off the podium with a fourth-place time in 2:05.78, a full second ahead of her teammate Cammile Adams (2:06.78). Great Britain's Jemma Lowe (2:06.80), Hungary's Zsuzsanna Jakabos (2:07.33) and defending champion Liu Zige (2:07.77) rounded out the field.

Notable swimmers missed the final roster featuring Australia's Jessicah Schipper, a former world record holder; and Poland's Otylia Jędrzejczak, a 2004 Olympic champion, both of whom placed thirteenth (2:08.21) and sixteenth (2:13.09) respectively in the semifinals.

Records
Prior to this competition, the existing world and Olympic records were as follows.

The following records were established during the competition:

Results

Heats

Semifinals

Semifinal 1

Semifinal 2

Final

References

External links
NBC Olympics Coverage

Women's 00200 metre butterfly
2012 in women's swimming
Women's events at the 2012 Summer Olympics